Paraplectana tsushimensis is a spider in the orb-weaver family, Araneidae, native to China, Japan, and Taiwan. It is commonly called the ladybird mimic spider.

The species belongs to the genus Paraplectana. The scientific name of the species was first published in 1960 by Yamaguchi.

References

Araneidae
Spiders of Asia
Mimicry
Spiders described in 1960